The Piano Trio No. 1 in B-flat major (Divertimento), K. 254, was written by Wolfgang Amadeus Mozart in 1776. It is scored for piano, violin and cello.

Movements 
The work is in three movements:

References

External links

Piano trios by Wolfgang Amadeus Mozart
Compositions in B-flat major
1776 compositions